The 2018 Big Ten Conference Men's Ice Hockey Tournament was the fifth tournament in conference history. It was played between March 2 and March 17, 2018, on campus locations. The winner of the tournament was the Notre Dame Fighting Irish, who earned the Big Ten's automatic bid to the 2018 NCAA Division I Men's Ice Hockey Tournament.

Format
The 2018 tournament featured a new three-weekend format with all games taking place on the campus of the higher-seeded teams. The tournament opened March 2-4 with three best-of-three quarterfinal series, as the second-, third-and fourth-seeded teams each hosted a series. The top-seeded team had a bye to the single-elimination semifinals, which was played on March 10. The highest-seeded team remaining after the semifinals hosted a championship game on March 17.

Conference standings
Note: GP = Games played; W = Wins; L = Losses; T = Ties; PTS = Points; GF = Goals For; GA = Goals Against

Bracket

Note: * denotes overtime periods.

Quarterfinals

(2) Ohio State vs. (7) Michigan State

(3) Michigan vs. (7) Wisconsin

(4) Penn State vs. (5) Minnesota

Semifinals

(1) Notre Dame vs. (4) Penn State

(2) Ohio State vs. (3) Michigan

Championship

(1) Notre Dame vs. (2) Ohio State

Tournament awards

All-Tournament Team
G Cale Morris* (Notre Dame)
D Jordan Gross (Notre Dame)
D Matt Miller (Ohio State)
F Cam Morrison (Notre Dame)
F Mason Jobst (Ohio State)
F Tanner Laczynski (Ohio State)
* Most Outstanding Player(s)

References

External links
 Big Ten Tournament information

Big Ten Men's Ice Hockey Tournament
Big Ten Men's Ice Hockey Tournament